Dorogi Futball Club is a Hungarian football club from Dorog. They currently play in Nemzeti Bajnokság II.

Stadium
Dorog play their home matches at the Buzánszky Jenő Stadion in Dorog.

Current squad
As of 23 February 2023.

Honours
 Magyar Kupa
 Runner-up : 1951–52

References

External links 
  

 
Football clubs in Hungary
Association football clubs established in 1914
1914 establishments in Hungary
Mining association football clubs in Hungary
Komárom-Esztergom County